Bajan Helicopters Limited was a Bridgetown-based, Barbadian aviation company which was founded in 1989 and ceased trading in April 2009.
 
The company provided a number of helicopter supported services, such as Offshore/Maritime support, surveying, shipping services, aerial filming/photography, and aerial island tours, and managed the Bridgetown Heliport (ICAO): TBPO), situated in the Islands' capital. It transported such high-profile members as the British Royal Family around the Caribbean region and was affiliated with the Helicopter Association International.

See also
List of Barbadian companies

Notes

External links
Fun Barbados: Bajan Helicopters

Defunct helicopter airlines
Defunct airlines of Barbados
Aviation companies based in Barbados
Airlines established in 1989
Companies based in Bridgetown
1989 establishments in Barbados
2009 disestablishments in Barbados